The Twin Falls Idaho Temple is a temple of the Church of Jesus Christ of Latter-day Saints located in Twin Falls, Idaho, just south of the Snake River Canyon. It became the fourth Latter-day Saint temple in the state when it was dedicated in August 2008 and the second temple dedicated in Idaho that year.

Announcement
Church president Gordon B. Hinckley announced the construction of a temple for the Magic Valley region of Idaho in his opening remarks of general conference held October 2, 2004, to serve the thousands of members who live in southern Idaho between the Boise and Idaho Falls temples.

Rumors of the temple started several weeks before general conference when the church's negotiations to purchase the Candleridge Golf Course came to light. The financially unprofitable course had already announced its intention to close on December 31, 2004, yet over 300 residents near the golf course produced a petition protesting the loss of the golf course to the temple, upset that their investments into homes next to a golf course would become investments into homes bordering a busy church. In response, the church distributed printed materials, stating its intentions to work with neighbors with regard to traffic and parking when the time came to present plans to the city.

Plans
The Twin Falls Planning and Zoning Commission approved the necessary permits for the building of the temple on November 8, 2005. The commission approved a special-use permit for a temple and meetinghouse and also approved a variance for the temple to exceed the city's  maximum height limit. The commission's approval allowed the church to move to the next stages of planning and to address parking concerns expressed by commission members, who worried that the 300-space parking lot may be insufficient.

Plans for the temple, inspired by nearby Shoshone Falls, were unveiled on October 6, 2005, at a press conference held in the former Candleridge Golf Course clubhouse. The model displayed the upcoming white two-story temple, which was capped with a gold-leafed angel Moroni atop a spire rising  in the air on May 30, 2007—making it the highest point in the area. Also sharing the  complex is a new stake center, over 300 parking spaces, and charming tree-lined boulevards and gardens. The church, which went to great lengths to minimize the worries of neighbors, contracted with developer Ken Edmunds to subdivide the balance of the  plot to complement the existing neighborhood.

Groundbreaking
Ground was broken for the temple on April 15, 2006—the day before Easter Sunday. Presiding at the ceremony was Neil L. Andersen of the Presidency of the Seventy. Stake presidents and their families comprised most of the audience at the invitation-only event. The temple serves approximately 50,000 area church members.

Open house and dedication
The Twin Falls Temple held an open house and conducted tours from July 11, 2008 until August 15, 2008, excluding Sundays. The church reported that visitors during the open house totaled nearly 160,000, approximately 60 percent of whom were church members. The temple was dedicated on August 24, 2008 in 4 sessions. A cultural celebration took place at the Twin Falls County Fairgrounds the evening preceding the dedication. Ordinance work began the Monday following the dedication. Retired Burley dairy farmer and former member of the Second Quorum of the Seventy, D. Rex Gerratt, served as the first president.

A cornerstone session and four dedicatory sessions took place on August 24, 2008. LDS Church president Thomas S. Monson presided at the dedication and was assisted by other church general authorities, including Henry B. Eyring, Quentin L. Cook and Claudio R. M. Costa. Due to overwhelming interest and limited seating in the temple, the final session was broadcast to various church buildings throughout Idaho.

See also

 Comparison of temples of The Church of Jesus Christ of Latter-day Saints
 List of temples of The Church of Jesus Christ of Latter-day Saints
 List of temples of The Church of Jesus Christ of Latter-day Saints by geographic region
 Temple architecture (Latter-day Saints)
 The Church of Jesus Christ of Latter-day Saints in Idaho

References

External links
 
 Twin Falls Idaho Temple Official site
 Twin Falls Idaho Temple at ChurchofJesusChristTemples.org

21st-century Latter Day Saint temples
Buildings and structures in Twin Falls County, Idaho
Religious buildings and structures completed in 2008
Temples (LDS Church) in Idaho
Temples (LDS Church) in the United States
2008 establishments in Idaho